Gare de la Part-Dieu (literally "Property of God" railway station) is the primary railway station of Lyon's Central Business District in France. It belongs to the Paris-Lyon-Marseille railway. Train services are mainly operated by SNCF with frequent TGV high-speed and TER regional services as well as Eurostar and Deutsche Bahn. Lyon's second railway station, Gare de Lyon-Perrache, is located in the south of the historical centre.

History

Originally opened in 1859 as a freight station, the station was constructed in 1978 as part of the new Part-Dieu urban neighborhood project. As the planners intended Part-Dieu to act as a second city center for Lyon, the large train station was built in conjunction with a shopping center (the largest in France), a major government office complex, and the tallest skyscraper in the region, nicknamed Le Crayon (The Pencil) due to its shape. Before the construction of the Gare de la Part-Dieu, the neighborhood was served by the Gare des Brotteaux. It closed in 1982 and its operations were absorbed into this station.

Lyon-Part-Dieu is the busiest French train station outside of Île-de-France.  There are five other stations operating within the city limits: Perrache (in the city center), Lyon-Vaise, Saint-Paul, Gorge de Loup, and Jean Macé Station. The Rhônexpress tram connects Lyon-Part-Dieu to Lyon–Saint-Exupéry Airport, located in Colombier-Saugnieu, whose train station is only served by the high-speed train network.

In spring 2018, major reconstruction and refurbishment works began to rebuild the entire station and its near surroundings by 2022. As of December 2018, the former entrance building has been already partly torn down.

Traffic
The station has significantly surpassed its initial traffic expectations, from a moderate 35,000 passengers a day in 1983 to 80,000 passengers on 500 trains a day in 2001. Because of the increased traffic, the station was renovated from 1995–2001 to increase the number of platforms and alter the exterior. In 2010, the station served roughly 51.1 million passengers, approaching 140,000 for an average weekday.

Local transportation
Lyon Part-Dieu has direct access to the Lyon Metro (line B) and tramways T1, T3, and T4. Part-Dieu is also connected to Lyon Saint-Exupéry Airport via the dedicated Rhônexpress tram service.

Rail connections
Part-Dieu is a significant railway hub, connected to the French (SNCF) and international rail networks. From the many lines that run through Lyon, Part-Dieu is directly connected to Paris, Marseille, Valence, Saint-Étienne, Nice, Montpellier, Perpignan, Barcelona, Rouen, Roissy, Lille, Brussels, Geneva, Tours, mulhouse , belfort , Metz, Strasbourg, Nantes, Rennes, Grenoble, Avignon, Aix-en-Provence, Le Havre,  le mans  , Karlsruhe, Frankfurt, Milan, Turin, London. Part-Dieu also has connections to Paris Charles de Gaulle Airport (CDG) by TGV and has been assigned the "XYD" airport code. The SNCF offers connection services to CDG called TGV Air, under code sharing agreements with many airlines.

Current international services 

 High speed services (TGV) Brussels—Lille—Marne-la-Vallée—Lyon—Marseille
High speed services (TGV) Brussels—Lille—Marne-la-Vallée—Lyon—Nîmes—Montpellier-Perpignan
High speed services (TGV) Frankfurt—Karlsruhe—Strasbourg—Mulhouse—Besançon—Lyon—Marseille
High speed services (TGV) Luxembourg/Metz-Strasbourg—Mulhouse—Dijon—Lyon—Marseille/Montpellier
High speed services (FRECCIAROSSA) Paris—Lyon—Chambéry—Turin—Milan
High speed services (AVE) Lyon—Nîmes—Montpellier—Perpignan—Barcelona
Local service (TER Auvergne-Rhône-Alpes) Lyon-Part-Dieu—Ambérieu—Culoz—Bellegarde—Génève(Cornavin)

Current national services 
The station is served by France's high-speed rail service, TGV, and Intercités:

High speed services (TGV) Paris—Lyon/Saint-Étienne
High speed services (FRECCIAROSSA) Paris—Lyon
High speed services (TGV) Lyon—Marseille-Nice
High speed services (TGV) Lille—Marne-la-Vallée—Lyon—Nîmes—Montpellier
High speed services (TGV) Lille—Arras—Marne-la-Vallée—Lyon—Nîmes—Montpellier
High speed services (TGV) Lille—Arras—Marne-la-Vallée—Lyon—Marseille
High speed services (TGV) Nancy—Strasbourg—Besançon—Dijon—Lyon—Marseille—Nice
High speed services (TGV) Toulouse—Montpellier—Lyon
High speed services (TGV) Rennes/Nantes—Massy TGV—Lyon/Marseille/Montpellier
High speed services (TGV) Le Havre—Rouen—Massy TGV—Lyon—Marseille
Intercity services (Intercités) Nantes—Tours—Bourges—Nevers—Moulins—Lyon

Current local services 
Regional services offered by TER Auvergne-Rhône-Alpes:
Local service (TER Auvergne-Rhône-Alpes) Lyon—Mâcon—Chalon-sur-Saône—Dijon—Laroche-Migennes—Sens—Paris
Local service (TER Auvergne-Rhône-Alpes) Lyon—Ambérieu—Bellegarde—Genève/St Gervais-les-Bains/Evian-les-Bains
Local service (TER Auvergne-Rhône-Alpes) Lyon—Ambérieu—Bourg-en-Bresse—Lons-le-Saunier—Besançon—Belfort
Local service (TER Auvergne-Rhône-Alpes) Lyon—Chambéry—Bourg-Saint-Maurice/Modane
Local service (TER Auvergne-Rhône-Alpes) Lyon—Bourgoin-Jallieu—Grenoble
Local service (TER Auvergne-Rhône-Alpes) Lyon—Vienne—Valence—Montélimar—Orange—Avignon—Miramas—Marseille
Local service (TER Auvergne-Rhône-Alpes) Lyon—Tarare—Roanne—Vichy—Clermont-Ferrand
Local service (TER Auvergne-Rhône-Alpes) Lyon—Givors—Saint-Étienne—Firminy
Local service (TER Auvergne-Rhône-Alpes) Lyon—Lozanne—Paray-le-Monial—Saincaize—Bourges—Tours
Local service (TER Auvergne-Rhône-Alpes) Lyon—Villars-les-Dombes—Bourg-en-Bresse

Projected services 

 Intercity service Bordeaux-Lyon with new cooperative operator Railcoop, planned for mid-2022

See also 
 Transport in Rhône-Alpes
 TER Auvergne-Rhône-Alpes

References

External links 

 

3rd arrondissement of Lyon
Part-Dieu
Railway stations in France opened in 1983
Lyon
Lyon-Partdieu